Adhur Shanker Alva (22 April, 1906 – 1977) was an Indian politician, lawyer and Member of Parliament who represented the Mangalore Constituency in the 3rd Lok Sabha. He was a member of Indian National Congress.

Biography

Alva was born in an affluent Tulu speaking Bunt family of landlords. He belonged to Adkathabail family of Kasaragod. He completed his education at St. Aloysius College (Mangalore) and Madras Law College  earning the degrees of B.A. and L.L.B. A widower through much of his life, he raised four children as a single parent. Apart from being a politician he was a lawyer practicing in Mangalore and was a member of various social, cultural and sporting organizations. He contested and won Assembly election from Puttur Dakshina Kannada and became Cabinet Minister for Co-operation when Devaraj Urs was the CM.

Position Held

References

External links
Reference to the "late Shanker Alva"

1906 births
Year of death missing
Indian National Congress politicians from Karnataka
India MPs 1962–1967
People from Kasaragod district
Lok Sabha members from Karnataka
Politicians from Mangalore
Mysore MLAs 1972–1977